Vice-Admiral John Thomas Goslin Pereira PVSM, AVSM (February 1923 – 16 November 2020) was a decorated Indian Navy admiral and naval engineer.

Early career
Pereira began his career on the training ship Dufferin in 1939 and underwent cadet training at the Britannia Royal Naval College in 1941. He qualified as a marine engineer at the Royal Naval Engineering College, commissioned an engineer acting sub-lieutenant in the Royal Indian Navy on 1 May 1944, he was promoted to engineer sub-lieutenant on 1 September (seniority from 1 August 1943). During the Second World War, he served aboard the battleships HMS Ramillies and  HMS Howe, and on the light cruiser HMS Nigeria, ending the war as an acting lieutenant. In October 1946, he was promoted to substantive engineer lieutenant (seniority from 1 October 1944).

Post-Independence
In September 1948, Pereira returned to India as the Senior Watch Keeper on HMIS Delhi. He was later selected for the Advanced Marine Engineering Course at the Royal Naval College, Greenwich. He served as engineer officer on INS Delhi, INS Mysore and INS Rana. In 1954, as an acting commander, Pereira was appointed assistant manager of IN Dockyard Bombay, and was promoted to substantive engineer commander on 31 December 1955. On 6 May 1960, he was promoted to acting captain on special duty "in connection with the acquisition of Mazagaon Docks," and on 17 June was further appointed Fleet Engineering Officer (Ashore) on the staff of the Flag Officer Commanding Indian Fleet.

From 1963, Pereira had an instrumental role in the expansion and modernisation of the Naval Dockyard Bombay, including building a new cruiser graving dock and keeping up with new technologies for repairing engines and weapons systems. He rose to become Director of Naval Engineering and subsequently Industrial Manager of the Naval Dockyard. During the 1971 Indo-Pakistan War, Commodore Pereira was the chief staff officer (Technical) of the Western Naval Command, and was involved in planning key naval operations, including a major missile attack on Karachi. Already awarded the Ati Vishisht Seva Medal (AVSM) in 1971, he was awarded the Param Vishisht Seva Medal (PVSM) for his contributions to victory by maintaining the ships of the Western Naval Command in a high state of efficiency.

Pereira was promoted to rear admiral on 8 August 1972 and appointed Admiral Superintendent Naval Dockyard Bombay. On 1 July 1976, he was promoted to vice-admiral and appointed Chief of Material. He retired in 1979.

A noted socialite and racehorse owner, Pereira settled down at his beachfront property in Karanja with his family. He died after a brief illness at the naval hospital INSH Asvini in south Mumbai, aged 97, and was survived by his son Michael and daughter Jennifer.

References

1923 births
2020 deaths
Indian Navy admirals
Indian sailors
Indian military personnel of World War II
Royal Indian Navy officers
Recipients of the Param Vishisht Seva Medal
Chiefs of Materiel (India)